The Union National Bank and Annex in Minot, North Dakota are two buildings in the Classical Revival style that were listed together on the National Register of Historic Places in 1983.

It was built to replace the Union National Bank that was destroyed by fire on July 9, 1923.

It was designed by Minot architect George H. Bugenhagen (1883-1953) in association with St. Paul, Minnesota architect Frederick C. Klawiter (1889-1983).

References

Neoclassical architecture in North Dakota
Commercial buildings completed in 1924
Buildings and structures in Minot, North Dakota
Bank buildings on the National Register of Historic Places in North Dakota
National Register of Historic Places in Ward County, North Dakota
1924 establishments in North Dakota